Argyrodella is a monotypic genus of Seychelloise comb-footed spiders containing the single species, Argyrodella pusillus. It was first described by Michael I. Saaristo in 2006, and is found on the Seychelles.

It is endemic to the Seychelles, and can be found on the islands of Mahé and Silhouette. It lives in woodland habitats, where it spins orb webs or is a kleptoparasite of the red-legged golden orb-web spider. It is threatened by habitat deterioration due to invasive plants, especially Cinnamomum verum.

See also
 List of Theridiidae species

References

Endemic fauna of Seychelles
IUCN Red List vulnerable species
Monotypic Araneomorphae genera
Spiders of Africa
Theridiidae
Vulnerable animals